This is a list of the number-one hits of 2016 on the Italian Singles and Albums Charts, ranked by FIMI.

See also
 2016 in music
 List of number-one hits in Italy

References

Number-one hits
Italy
2016